Daniel Carver is an American white supremacist and former Grand Dragon of the "Invisible Empire, Knights of the Ku Klux Klan" based in Georgia. Carver was suspended from wearing Klan robes and from attending Klan rallies after a  1986 conviction for "terroristic threats". His family was reported to have ties to the Dixie Mafia during its heyday in the 70's.

In October 1987 he was sued for violating the civil rights of others in Forsyth County, Georgia, after interfering in the "Brotherhood March" celebrating Martin Luther King Jr. Day. He and several other members of two Ku Klux Klan groups threw bottles and rocks at the marchers, and encouraged other crowd members to follow suit. Fines of around $940,000 were issued; the Invisible Empire of the Ku Klux Klan were fined $400,000 and he personally was ordered to pay $30,000 in punitive damages to the marchers.

Daniel Carver was a frequent guest on The Howard Stern Show and a former member of the show's Wack Pack.

References

External links

Living people
Ku Klux Klan Grand Dragons
People from Gainesville, Georgia
Year of birth missing (living people)